The Episcopal Church in Micronesia is a mission within Province VIII of the Episcopal Church. It has four congregations, three on Guam and one on Saipan, in the Commonwealth of the Northern Mariana Islands, as well as St. John's Episcopal School in Upper Tumon, Guam. The 2021 parochial reports indicated two parishes and 218 members.

Congregations:

St. Andrew's by the Philippine Sea, Agat, Guam
St. John the Divine Church, Tamuning, Guam
St. Michael and All Angels church, Dededo, Guam
St. Paul's Episcopal Mission, Chalan Kanoa, Saipan, Commonwealth of the Northern Mariana Islands

References

External links 
 
St. John’s School Official Homepage

Micronesia
Protestantism in Guam
Province 8 of the Episcopal Church (United States)